Corillidae is a family of gastropods in the order Stylommatophora.

Genera
Corilla Adams & Adams, 1855

References

External links